Harry Wilson (22 November 1897 – 6 September 1978) was a British character actor who appeared in over 300 films from 1928 to 1965 and proudly proclaimed himself "Hollywood's ugliest man".

His distinctive facial features and voice (often said to be the result of acromegaly, a disorder of the pituitary gland, although they do not fully meet the criteria) often led to him being cast as various henchmen, thugs, convicts and brawlers. His best-known roles include a Winkie Guard in The Wizard of Oz (1939); the female monster in Frankenstein's Daughter (1958); and together with Mike Mazurki, the henchman of George Raft's "Spats Colombo" in Some Like It Hot (1959).

In 1961, in a credited role, he appeared as a townsman in the TV Western series Bat Masterson (S3E18 "The Prescott Campaign").

For over fifteen years Wilson was a stand-in for Wallace Beery, and he is the grandfather of actress Shauna Bloom.

Wilson died in 1978, aged 80.

Selected filmography

 The Racket (1928) - Man at Funeral (uncredited)
 Shadow of the Law (1930) - Convict (uncredited)
 The Big House (1930) - Inmate #46375 (uncredited)
 Her Man (1930) - Drunken Sailor (uncredited)
 Way for a Sailor (1930) - Navy Man in Brawl (uncredited)
 A Lady's Morals (1930) - Tavern Extra (uncredited)
 The Gay Diplomat (1931) - Footman (uncredited)
 Sidewalks of New York (1931) - One of Butch's Henchmen (uncredited)
 The Tip-Off (1931) - Hood at Scarno's (uncredited)
 The Mad Genius (1931) - Curtain Man (uncredited)
 The Guilty Generation (1931) - Emmett - Mike's Henchman (uncredited)
 Ladies of the Big House (1931) - Buddy (uncredited)
 Delicious (1931) - Workman on Ship Cargo Deck (uncredited)
 The Beast of the City (1932) - Sam's Henchman (uncredited)
 Grand Hotel (1932) - Worker (uncredited)
 Night Court (1932) - Acquitted Truck Driver (uncredited)
 Huddle (1932) - Stoker in Mill (uncredited)
 The Dark Horse (1932) - Man in Jail Cell (uncredited)
 My Pal, the King (1932) - Soldier (uncredited)
 Blondie of the Follies (1932) - Loading Dock Worker (uncredited)
 Hold 'Em Jail (1932) - Sam's Son (uncredited)
 The Golden West (1932) - Townsman (uncredited)
 The Sport Parade (1932) - Heckler in Montage (uncredited)
 20,000 Years in Sing Sing (1932) - Seated Prisoner (uncredited)
 Born to Fight (1932) - Gang Member
 Goldie Gets Along (1933) - Fan at Beauty Contest (uncredited)
 Child of Manhattan (1933) - Loveland Dance Hall Extra (uncredited)
 Grand Slam (1933) - Mug (uncredited)
 Gabriel Over the White House (1933) - Nick's Henchman (uncredited)
 The Mayor of Hell (1933) - Joe's Henchman (uncredited)
 The Man Who Dared (1933) - Coal Miner (uncredited)
 Baby Face (1933) - Laborer (uncredited)
 The Prizefighter and the Lady (1933) - Training Camp Observer (uncredited)
 Hoopla (1933) - Roustabout (uncredited)
 Gambling Lady (1934) - Funeral Attendee (uncredited)
 Coming Out Party (1934) - Delivery Man (uncredited)
 Lazy River (1934) - Prisoner (uncredited)
 Whirlpool (1934) - Carnival Customer in Brawl (uncredited)
 Sing and Like It (1934) - Mug in Pool Hall (uncredited)
 We're Not Dressing (1934) - Smiling Sailor (uncredited)
 Such Women Are Dangerous (1934) - Court Bailiff (uncredited)
 The Cat's-Paw (1934) - Gangster (uncredited)
 The Affairs of Cellini (1934) - Henchman (uncredited)
 Judge Priest (1934) - Townsman in Saloon (uncredited)
 Lady by Choice (1934) - Bar Brawler (uncredited)
 The Captain Hates the Sea (1934) - Sailor (uncredited)
 The Painted Veil (1934) - Extra in Hong Kong Scene (uncredited)
 365 Nights in Hollywood (1934) - Student Actor (uncredited)
 Mills of the Gods (1934) - Bit Role (uncredited)
 The Best Man Wins (1935) - Seaman (uncredited)
 Under Pressure (1935) - Cement Worker (uncredited)
 The Whole Town's Talking (1935) - Convict (uncredited)
 Les Misérables (1935) - Galley Fight Warder (uncredited)
 The Case of the Curious Bride (1935) - Mug Bringing Oscar to Mason's (uncredited)
 Mary Jane's Pa''' (1935) - Roughneck (uncredited)
 Break of Hearts (1935) - Stagehand (uncredited)
 After the Dance (1935) - Convict (uncredited)
 Dante's Inferno (1935) - Stoker (uncredited)
 Metropolitan (1935) - Stage Hand (uncredited)
 One Way Ticket (1935) - Con (uncredited)
 A Tale of Two Cities (1935) - Revolutionary (uncredited)
 Riffraff (1936) - Man on Dance Floor (uncredited)
 Tough Guy (1936) - Gangster (uncredited)
 Anything Goes (1936) - Plug Ugly (uncredited)
 Modern Times (1936) - Worker (uncredited)
 The Bohemian Girl (1936) - Executioner (uncredited)
 The Country Doctor (1936) - Married Logger (uncredited)
 Flash Gordon (1936, Serial) - Pit Control Operator (uncredited)
 Sworn Enemy (1936) - Strongarm Man (uncredited)
 Our Relations (1936) - Seaman (uncredited)
 Murder with Pictures (1936) - Girard Henchman (uncredited)
 The Gay Desperado (1936) - Movie Theatre Brawler (uncredited)
 All American Chump (1936) - Gangster (uncredited)
 Come and Get It (1936) - Barfly (uncredited)
 Three Smart Girls (1936) - Man in Custody (uncredited)
 That Girl from Paris (1936) - Dock Worker (uncredited)
 God's Country and the Woman (1937) - Logger (uncredited)
 You Only Live Once (1937) - Convict Watching Baseball Game (uncredited)
 Man of the People (1937) - Workman (uncredited)
 Sea Devils (1937) - Saloon Waiter (uncredited)
 Pick a Star (1937) - Actor in Saloon Brawl Scene (uncredited)
 San Quentin (1937) - Marching Convict (uncredited)
 A Day at the Races (1937) - Detective with Sheriff (uncredited)
 Meet the Boyfriend (1937) - Thug (uncredited)
 Topper (1937) - Onlooker at Street Brawl (uncredited)
 The Big Shot (1937) - Chauffeur (uncredited)
 Big City (1937) - Comet Cab Driver (uncredited)
 The Bride Wore Red (1937) - Sailor at Cordellera Bar (uncredited)
 The Wrong Road (1937) - Convict (uncredited)
 Tim Tyler's Luck (1937, Serial) - Henchman [Ch. 12] (uncredited)
 The Big Broadcast of 1938 (1938) - Member of Black Gang (uncredited)
 A Slight Case of Murder (1938) - Butch (uncredited)
 King of the Newsboys (1938) - Coachman (uncredited)
 He Couldn't Say No (1938) - Jostled Subway Rider (uncredited)
 The Adventures of Marco Polo (1938) - Guard with Chamberlain (uncredited)
 Professor Beware (1938) - Brawler (uncredited)
 Racket Busters (1938) - Truck Driver (uncredited)
 Valley of the Giants (1938) - Landowner (uncredited)
 If I Were King (1938) - Beggar (uncredited)
 The Cowboy and the Lady (1938) - Man Shaving (uncredited)
 The Phantom Creeps (1939, Serial) - Schooner Crewman (uncredited)
 Flying G-Men (1939) - Henchman (uncredited)
 Let Freedom Ring (1939) - Barfly / Workman (uncredited)
 Bulldog Drummond's Secret Police (1939) - Moving Man (uncredited)
 Bridal Suite (1939) - Mountaineer with Guide (uncredited)
 Captain Fury (1939) - Convict (uncredited)
 The Gracie Allen Murder Case (1939) - Thug (uncredited)
 Invitation to Happiness (1939) - Man at Nightclub Entrance (uncredited)
 Coast Guard (1939) - Second Expressman (uncredited)
 The Wizard of Oz (1939) - Winkie (uncredited)
 Bad Little Angel (1939) - Fireman (uncredited)
 Invisible Stripes (1939) - Worker (uncredited)
 Northwest Passage (1940) - Ranger (uncredited)
 One Million B.C. (1940) - Rock Person
 Boom Town (1940) - Townsman (uncredited)
 Wyoming (1940) - Townsman (uncredited)
 The Great Dictator (1940) - Soldier in Field (uncredited)
 Go West (1940) - Barfly / Train Passenger (uncredited)
 Maisie Was a Lady (1941) - Man at Carnival Sideshow (uncredited)
 Ridin' on a Rainbow (1941) - Cupid in Holiday Pageant (uncredited)
 Road Show (1941) - Townsman in Brawl (uncredited)
 Footlight Fever (1941) - Mike - Sailor in Pinky's Bar (uncredited)
 Hold That Ghost (1941) - Harry (uncredited)
 Honky Tonk (1941) - Cowboy on Back of Train (uncredited)
 Birth of the Blues (1941) - One of Blackie's Thugs (uncredited)
 Shadow of the Thin Man (1941) - Mug Shoving Waiter / Racetrack Security Guard (uncredited)
 Call Out the Marines (1942) - Café Patron (uncredited)
 Woman of the Year (1942) - Lubbeck's Bodyguard (uncredited)
 Born to Sing (1942) - Getaway Cabbie (uncredited)
 Tarzan's New York Adventure (1942) - Circus Roustabout (uncredited)
 Pardon My Sarong (1942) - Varnoff's Henchman (uncredited)
 The Big Street (1942) - Fethington (uncredited)
 Stand by for Action (1942) - Sailor (uncredited)
 Hangmen Also Die! (1943) - Ugly German Bodyguard (uncredited)
 Pilot No. 5 (1943) - Pinball Player (uncredited)
 Batman (1943, Serial) - Henchman (uncredited)
 Swing Fever (1943) - Killer's Second (uncredited)
 The Cross of Lorraine (1943) - French Soldier (uncredited)
 Bermuda Mystery (1944) - Wharf Rat (uncredited)
 The Hairy Ape (1944) - Tough in Bar (uncredited)
 Louisiana Hayride (1944) - Listener on Train (uncredited)
 Call of the Rockies (1944) - Miner (uncredited)
 Haunted Harbor (1944, Serial) - Barfly [Ch. 1] (uncredited)
 Lost in a Harem (1944) - Native in Café Audience (uncredited)
 The Princess and the Pirate (1944) - Pirate at the 'Bucket of Blood' (uncredited)
 The Lost Weekend (1945) (uncredited)
 The Captain from Köpenick (1945) - Suspect in Police Station (uncredited)
 Frisco Sal (1945) - Piano Tuner (uncredited)
 Within These Walls (1945) - Convict (uncredited)
 Her Highness and the Bellboy (1945) - Jake's Joint Patron (uncredited)
 Adventure (1945) - Big Mug (uncredited)
 A Letter for Evie (1946) - Uncle (uncredited)
 The Bandit of Sherwood Forest (1946) - Outlaw (uncredited)
 Of Human Bondage (1946) - Tough Guy (uncredited)
 Lawless Breed (1946) - Ugly Henchman Darning Sock (uncredited)
 The Strange Woman (1946) - Lumberjack (uncredited)
 High Barbaree (1947) - Vendor (uncredited)
 Brute Force (1947) - Tyrone (uncredited)
 Killer Dill (1947) - Diner in Opening Montage (uncredited)
 Heaven Only Knows (1947) - Angry Man at Meeting (uncredited)
 Wild Harvest (1947) - Alperson Crew Member (uncredited)
 Forever Amber (1947) - Minor Role (uncredited)
 High Wall (1947) - Patient in Visitors' Room (uncredited)
 Are You with It? (1948) - Porky (uncredited)
 Saigon (1948) - Stevedore (uncredited)
 A Southern Yankee (1948) - Confederate Soldier (uncredited)
 Macbeth (1948) - Banquet Guest (uncredited)
 Luxury Liner (1948) - Ship's Crewman (uncredited)
 Unknown Island (1948) - Barfly (uncredited)
 The Three Musketeers (1948) - Kidnapper (uncredited)
 Kiss the Blood Off My Hands (1948) - Man in Pub (uncredited)
 He Walked by Night (1948) - Prison Inmate (uncredited)
 Hills of Home (1948) - Wild Man (uncredited)
 The Paleface (1948) - Cowboy in Saloon (uncredited)
 Force of Evil (1948) - Henchman (uncredited)
 Wake of the Red Witch (1948) - 'Red Witch' Seaman (uncredited)
 Knock on Any Door (1949) - Man (uncredited)
 Take Me Out to the Ball Game (1949) - Baseball Game Attendee (uncredited)
 A Connecticut Yankee in King Arthur's Court (1949) - Guard (uncredited)
 Anna Lucasta (1949) - Barfly (uncredited)
 Rope of Sand (1949) - Guard (uncredited)
 Thieves' Highway (1949) - Fifth, Ugly Man at City Bar (uncredited)
 The Reckless Moment (1949) - Man in Bus Depot (uncredited)
 All the King's Men (1949) - One of Duffy's Goons (uncredited)
 Bride for Sale (1949) - Bruiser (uncredited)
 Buccaneer's Girl (1950) - Bertram (uncredited)
 Quicksand (1950) - Pier Spectator (uncredited)
 Cargo to Capetown (1950) - Brawling Seaman / Deck Crewman (uncredited)
 Comanche Territory (1950) - Barfly (uncredited)
 Beware of Blondie (1950) - Convict (uncredited)
 Fortunes of Captain Blood (1950) - Crew Member (uncredited)
 Abbott and Costello in the Foreign Legion (1950) - Thug (uncredited)
 Convicted (1950) - Convict in Prison Yard (uncredited)
 The Fuller Brush Girl (1950) - Crew Member (uncredited)
 Wyoming Mail (1950) - Bet-Loser (uncredited)
 Last of the Buccaneers (1950) - Pirate (uncredited)
 Pygmy Island (1950) - Ugly Thug with Machine Gun (uncredited)
 Al Jennings of Oklahoma (1951) - Barfly (uncredited)
 The Enforcer (1951) - B.J. - Herman's Sidekick (uncredited)
 The Lemon Drop Kid (1951) - Courtroom Spectator (unconfirmed)
 M (1951) - Man in Mob (uncredited)
 Double Crossbones (1951) - Pirate (uncredited)
 China Corsair (1951) - Sailor / Henchman (uncredited)
 Journey Into Light (1951) - Bum (uncredited)
 Anne of the Indies (1951) - Pirate at Inn (uncredited)
 The Barefoot Mailman (1951) - Theron Henchman (uncredited)
 Scandal Sheet (1952) - Barfly (uncredited)
 Harem Girl (1952) - Jamal Henchman (uncredited)
 Lone Star (1952) - Townsman (uncredited)
 Mutiny (1952) - Crew Member (uncredited)
 The Sellout (1952) - Prisoner in Cell (uncredited)
 Apache Country (1952) - Henchman (uncredited)
 Montana Territory (1952) - Choppy (uncredited)
 Glory Alley (1952) - Pug in Saloon (uncredited)
 Plymouth Adventure (1952) - Pub Patron (uncredited)
 The Raiders (1952) - Juror (uncredited)
 Million Dollar Mermaid (1952) - Minor Role (uncredited)
 Against All Flags (1952) - Pirate (uncredited)
 Abbott and Costello Meet Captain Kidd (1952) - Ugly Pirate (uncredited)
 Fort Ti (1953) - Ranger Recruit (uncredited)
 Raiders of the Seven Seas (1953) - Pirate (uncredited)
 A Slight Case of Larceny (1953) - Youngwell (uncredited)
 The 5,000 Fingers of Dr. T. (1953) - Guard / Doorman (uncredited)
 Vice Squad (1953) - Man in Lineup (uncredited)
 Abbott and Costello Meet Dr. Jekyll and Mr. Hyde (1953) - Man Asking for Match (uncredited)
 The Golden Blade (1953) - Old Soldier (uncredited)
 Captain Scarface (1953) - Tall, Ugly Deck Sailor (uncredited)
 Crime Wave (1953) - Parolee (uncredited)
 Calamity Jane (1953) - Barfly (uncredited)
 Killer Ape (1953) - Dr. Andrews' Henchman (uncredited)
 Duffy of San Quentin (1954) - Lou - Convict (uncredited)
 Overland Pacific (1954) - Barfly (uncredited)
 Rails Into Laramie (1954) - Railroad Workman (uncredited)
 River of No Return (1954) - Prospector (uncredited)
 Them! (1954) - Alcoholic Ward Patient (uncredited)
 The Far Country (1954) - Miner (uncredited)
 Down Three Dark Streets (1954) - Brenda Ralles' Neighbor (uncredited)
 The Human Jungle (1954) - Man Being Booked at Station (uncredited)
 The Silver Chalice (1954) - Ruffian (uncredited)
 Sign of the Pagan (1954) - Hun (uncredited)
 Big House, U.S.A. (1955) - Inmate Who Starts Fight (uncredited)
 City of Shadows (1955) - Barfly (uncredited)
 It's Always Fair Weather (1955) - Butch McSween (uncredited)
 Trial (1955) - Courtroom Spectator (uncredited)
 Guys and Dolls (1955) - Singing Man in Barber Shop (uncredited)
 The Spoilers (1955) - Miner (uncredited)
 Mohawk (1956) - Settler (uncredited)
 Crime of Passion (1957) - Boxing Spectator (uncredited)
 Designing Woman (1957) - One of Daylor's Boys in Bar (uncredited)
 Man of a Thousand Faces (1957) - Extra in Bullpen (uncredited)
 Chicago Confidential (1957) - Wellwisher at Wedding (uncredited)
 My Man Godfrey (1957) - Dockhand (uncredited)
 Hell Bound (1957) - Seaman (uncredited)
 Merry Andrew (1958) - Roustabout (uncredited)
 The Sheepman (1958) - Town Loafer (uncredited)
 The Decks Ran Red (1958) - Helmsman (uncredited)
 Frankenstein's Daughter (1958) - The Monster
 The Buccaneer (1958) - Pirate with Eye Patch (uncredited)
 Some Like It Hot (1959) - Spats's henchman #2
 Ocean's 11 (1960) (uncredited)
 Heller in Pink Tights (1960) - Cheyenne Townsman (uncredited)
 Bloodlust! (1961) - Trophy (uncredited)
 Pocketful of Miracles (1961) - Slop - Pretends to be Governor of Utah (uncredited)
 Sergeants 3 (1962) - Barfly (uncredited)
 Kid Galahad (1962) - Bailey Fight Spectator (uncredited)
 Pressure Point (1962) - Convict / Inmate (uncredited)
 How the West Was Won (1962) - Cattleman at Barricade (uncredited)
 Billy Rose's Jumbo (1962) - Roustabout (uncredited)
 Irma la Douce (1963) - Wedding Guest (uncredited)
 4 for Texas (1963) - Red-Coated Waiter (uncredited)
 Robin and the 7 Hoods (1964) - Gisborne's Hood
 Dear Heart (1964) - Conventioneer (uncredited)
 The Greatest Story Ever Told (1965) (uncredited)
 The Hallelujah Trail (1965) - Miner (uncredited)
 The Great Race (1965) - Townsman (uncredited)
 The Money Trap (1965) - Man in Clinic (uncredited)
 The Cincinnati Kid'' (1965) - Spectator at Cockfight (uncredited) (final film role)

References

External links

1897 births
1978 deaths
English male film actors
English emigrants to the United States
Male actors from London
People with acromegaly
20th-century English male actors
Jewish English male actors